The B Line (formerly Red Line from 1993–2020) is a fully underground  rapid transit line operating in Los Angeles, running between Downtown Los Angeles and North Hollywood. It is one of seven lines in the Los Angeles Metro Rail system, operated by the Los Angeles County Metropolitan Transportation Authority.

The B Line is one of the city's two fully-underground subway lines (along with the D Line). The two lines share tracks through Downtown Los Angeles before separating in Koreatown. , the combined B and D lines averaged 133,413 boardings per weekday.

In 2020, Metro renamed all of its lines using letters and colors, with the Red Line becoming the B Line (retaining the red color in its service bullet) and the Purple Line becoming the D Line.

Service description

Route 
The B Line is a subway that begins at Union Station and travels southwest through Downtown Los Angeles, passing the Civic Center, Pershing Square (near the Historic Core) and the Financial District. The  hub station allows riders to transfer to the A Line (Blue Line) and E Line (Expo Line). Up to this point, the track is shared with the D Line; at Wilshire/Vermont, the two lines diverge. The B Line travels north along Vermont, and then west along Hollywood Boulevard, traveling through Koreatown and Hollywood. Finally, the line turns northwest and crosses into the San Fernando Valley, where it terminates in North Hollywood. The B Line is also designated for internal purposes as Route 802, as Metro Rail lines and related shuttles are given 8XX designations.

This route roughly follows a branch of the old Red Car system through the Cahuenga Pass, dismantled in the 1960s during what was later called the General Motors streetcar conspiracy.

Hours and frequency

Station listing 
The following table lists the stations of the B Line, from north to south. All stations are located in the city of Los Angeles, California.

Ridership 
Note: Ridership figures are for B and D Line combined.

History 

The current B Line is the product of a long-term plan to connect Downtown Los Angeles to central and western portions of the city with a subway system. Original proposals in the 1980s had it running down Wilshire Boulevard to Fairfax Avenue and then north to the San Fernando Valley. Residents in some parts of the city bitterly opposed the subway. A 1985 methane explosion at a Ross Dress for Less clothing store near Fairfax gave Rep. Henry Waxman, who represented the Fairfax District, a reason to derail the project that was opposed by his constituents by prohibiting tunneling in an alleged "methane zone" west of Western on Wilshire.

After some political wrangling, a new route was chosen up Vermont Avenue to Hollywood Boulevard.

The groundbreaking for the first segment of the subway was held on September 29, 1986, on the site of the future Civic Center/Grand Park station. Today's B Line was built in four minimum operating segments:

(At this point, the line's operator was still the Southern California Rapid Transit District).

On June 22, 1995, during the construction of MOS-2B, a sinkhole appeared on Hollywood Boulevard, barely missing several workers and causing damage to buildings on the street. Subway construction was delayed during the investigation and repairs of the sinkhole. The contractor on that segment project was replaced, and because of the perceived mismanagement of Red Line construction, in 1998 voters banned the use of existing sales taxes for subway tunneling.

Construction of MOS-3, by comparison, proceeded with relatively few issues. Tunneling from North Hollywood for the subway started in 1995. Workers dug under the Santa Monica Mountains using tunneling machines. Work progressed an average of  daily, performed by work crews round-the-clock six days a week.

Original proposals for the subway system included expansions east from Union Station to East Los Angeles and west from North Hollywood towards the Warner Center transit hub in the San Fernando Valley. Barred from subway tunneling, Metro turned to other types of mass transit. In the San Fernando Valley, residents passed a law in 1991 mandating that any rail line in the area be built underground, so Metro built a busway (now the G Line) from North Hollywood to Warner Center, which opened on October 29, 2005. East of Union Station, Metro built a light rail line with at-grade and underground segments to East Los Angeles, now part of the L Line, which opened on November 15, 2009.

Operations

Maintenance 

The B Line operates out of the Division 20 Yard (Santa Fe Yard), located at 320 South Santa Fe Avenue in Downtown Los Angeles. This yard stores the fleet used on the B and D Lines, and where heavy maintenance is performed. Cars reach this yard by continuing past Union Station, making a right turn and surfacing at the Eastern terminus of Ducommun Street. They then travel south to 1st Street, through a washing station, and enter the yard.

Rolling stock 
The B Line uses A650  electric multiple unit cars built by Breda in Italy. Trains usually run in six-car configurations during peak hours and four-car configurations otherwise. The cars are maintained in a Metro yard on Santa Fe Avenue near 4th Street alongside the Los Angeles River in downtown Los Angeles.

In March 2017, Metro ordered new CRRC HR4000 railcars, which will operate on the B Line when they are delivered.

Potential future extensions

Extension to Arts District 
In 2010, at the request of L.A. City Councilman Tom LaBonge, Metro staff studied the possibility of adding a station along the west bank of the Los Angeles River to 6th Street and Santa Fe Avenue. The study concluded that such an extension, completed at-grade along Metro-owned right-of-way, could be completed for as little as $90 million.

The study suggested an alternative station at the Division 20 Yard north of 4th Street and Santa Fe Avenue. This station would be closer to the residential population of the Arts District. As new turnback tracks will need to be built as part of the D Line Extension (to allow shorter headways), this Arts District extension could possibly be partially completed as part of the Purple Line Extension project, lowering the incremental cost of the station while increasing its usability.

Extensions to the South 

One of the proposals for the Vermont Transit Corridor being considered by Metro would extend a subway line from Wilshire/Vermont station down Vermont Avenue to 120th Street. Metro is also considering other types of mass transit for the line, including light rail and busway options.

Incidents 
 On December 22, 2006, a rider accidentally spilled a vial of mercury on the platform at the Pershing Square station. He notified the operator on a passenger intercom before boarding a train, but Los Angeles County Sheriff's Department did not know of the spillage until eight hours later. In response, Metro implemented new hazardous materials (Hazmat) training to its field employees and operators.
 On August 19, 2011, near the Hollywood/Vine station, an altercation between two passengers resulted in one being fatally stabbed. The suspect was arrested on August 24.
 On September 4, 2012, a 54-year-old man fell onto the tracks at the North Hollywood station and was hit by an oncoming train. He was rushed to hospital, where he later died.
 On May 22, 2018, an unidentified man "probably jumped" onto the tracks at the 7th St/Metro Center station and was hit by an oncoming train. He was rushed to a hospital, where he later died. It is unknown if it was suicide or not.

References

External links 

 MTA Home Page
 Red Line news

 
Public transportation in Los Angeles
Public transportation in the San Fernando Valley
Public transportation in Los Angeles County, California
Central Los Angeles
Downtown Los Angeles
Railway lines opened in 1993
 
1993 establishments in California